Walter Russell Brain, 1st Baron Brain (23 October 1895 – 29 December 1966) was a British neurologist. He was principal author of the standard work of neurology, Brain's Diseases of the Nervous System, and longtime editor of the neurological medical journal titled Brain. He is also eponymised with "Brain's reflex", a reflex exhibited by humans when assuming the quadrupedal position.

Career
Brain was educated at Mill Hill School and New College, Oxford, where he began to read history, but disliked it. The First World War having begun in 1914, the following year he joined the Friends' Ambulance Unit as an alternative to volunteering for combat, and was sent to York, moving later to the King George Hospital in London, attached to the X-ray department. On the introduction of conscription in 1916 his work enabled him to be exempted as a conscientious objector.

After the war he returned to New College, and studied medicine, obtaining his BM BCh in 1922 and a DM in 1925; he specialised in neurology. Apart from his clinical practice, he was a member of a large number of government committees pertaining to physical and mental health, and was involved in the care of Winston Churchill on the latter's deathbed in 1965.

He was elected a fellow of the Royal College of Physicians in 1931 and was president of that college from 1950 to 1956.

He was knighted in 1952, made a baronet on 29 June 1954, and on 26 January 1962, was created Baron Brain, of Eynsham in the County of Oxford. In March, 1964 he was elected a fellow of the Royal Society. In 1964 he gave the presidential address (Science and Behaviour) to the British Association meeting in Southampton. In this address he discussed how humanity was approaching the anthropocene and he reiterated Alfred North Whitehead's warning that "A muddled state of mind is prevalent. The increased plasticity of the environment for mankind, resulting from the advances in scientific technology, is being construed in terms of habits of thought which find their justification in the theory of a fixed environment."

Family
He married Stella Langdon-Down and had two sons, Christopher (b. 1926) and Michael (b. 1928) and one daughter, Janet (b. 1931). Janet went on to marry the doctor Leonard Arthur. Christopher succeeded him as the 2nd Baron Brain and 2nd Baronet Brain.

Religious beliefs
He became a Quaker in 1931 and gave the Swarthmore Lecture in 1944, 'Man, society and religion', in which he stressed the importance of a social conscience.

Arms

References

Further reading
 Roster of physician writers
 

1895 births
1966 deaths
Alumni of New College, Oxford
People associated with the Friends' Ambulance Unit
British conscientious objectors
British neurologists
British Quakers
Converts to Quakerism
20th-century British medical doctors
Barons in the Peerage of the United Kingdom
Fellows of the Royal College of Physicians
Fellows of the Royal Society
Knights Bachelor
Presidents of the Royal College of Physicians
People from Reading, Berkshire
Place of death missing
Hereditary barons created by Elizabeth II